Horsepen Creek is a  long 1st order tributary to the Uwharrie River in Montgomery County, North Carolina.

Course
Horsepen Creek rises on the Reeves Spring Branch divide in Montgomery County about 1 mile west of Coggins Mine, North Carolina.  Horsepen Creek then flows southeast and joins the Uwharrie River about 1 mile southeast of Coggins Mine.

Watershed
Horsepen Creek drains  of area, receives about 47.6 in/year of precipitation, has a wetness index of 333.64 and is about 94% forested.

See also
List of rivers of North Carolina

References

Rivers of North Carolina
Rivers of Montgomery County, North Carolina